The Leaf River is a tributary of the Rock River, about  long, in northwestern Illinois in the United States.  Via the Rock, it is part of the Mississippi River watershed.

Course
After rising east of the town of Shannon in northeastern Carroll County, the Leaf flows eastward across northwestern Ogle County, past the towns of Adeline and Leaf River.  It joins the Rock River from the west between the towns of Byron and Oregon.

See also
List of Illinois rivers
Other streams and places named Leaf River

References

Rivers of Illinois
Rivers of Ogle County, Illinois
Rivers of Carroll County, Illinois